Eudiocrinidae is a family of echinoderms belonging to the order Comatulida.

Genera:
 Eudiocrinus Carpenter, 1882

References

Comatulida
Echinoderm families